Semigorodnyaya is a rural locality (a station) and the administrative center of Semigorodneye Rural Settlement, Kharovsky District, Vologda Oblast, Russia. The population was 1,686 as of 2002.

Geography 
Semigorodnyaya is located 30 km south of Kharovsk (the district's administrative centre) by road. Vozrozhdeniye is the nearest rural locality.

References 

Rural localities in Kharovsky District